Munson Medical Center (MMC) is a 442-bed regional referral hospital in Traverse City, Michigan Its primary service area includes Antrim, Benzie, Grand Traverse, Kalkaska, and Leelanau counties.

The hospital also serves as a regional referral center for 24 counties in northern Michigan. It is one of two Level II Trauma Centers, north of Grand Rapids, with the other being UP Health System - Marquette. It also has the only Neonatal Intensive Care Unit in northern Michigan. Munson Medical Center has been designated as a Primary Stroke Center by the Joint Commission, and is a Bariatric Surgery Center of Excellence. Munson also offers the only inpatient Behavioral Health services in northern Michigan.

Munson Medical Center is the largest of nine Munson Healthcare system hospitals located throughout northern Michigan. It has a medical staff of 420 physicians representing more than 50 specialty services and employs 3,700 people. As part of Munson Healthcare, it is the largest employer north of US 10.

In addition to Munson Healthcare system hospitals, Munson Medical Center works closely with Helen Devos Children's Hospital in Grand Rapids, the University of Michigan Health System, in Ann Arbor, MidMichigan Medical Center - Alpena in Alpena, and War Memorial Hospital in Sault Ste. Marie.

Munson Medical Center is a teaching hospital, and partners with Michigan State University College of Human Medicine and College of Osteopathic Medicine to provide training to third and fourth year medical students. Munson Medical Center also operates a residency program for Family Practice specialists.

Hospitals 

 Cadillac Hospital - Cadillac
 Charlevoix Hospital - Charlevoix
 Foster Family Community Health Center - Traverse City
 Grayling Hospital - Grayling
 Kalkaska Memorial Health Center - Kalkaska
 Mackinac Straits Health System - St. Ignace
 Manistee Hospital - Manistee
 Munson Medical Center (flagship location) - Traverse City
 Otsego Memorial Hospital - Gaylord
 Paul Oliver Memorial Hospital - Frankfort

History
The beginnings of Munson Medical Center and Munson Healthcare can be traced to James Decker Munson, MD (1848–1929). Dr. Munson was the first superintendent of the state-owned Northern Michigan Asylum founded in 1885 (later known as Traverse City Psychiatric Hospital, which closed in 1989). He donated a boarding house for use as a community hospital in 1915. The permanent James Decker Munson Hospital opened in 1925 and still exists today within the Munson hospital complex. In 1949, the hospital and its land were deeded from the state to a new private corporation, James Decker Munson Hospital, Inc. The hospital was renamed in 1964 to reflect its changing status as a regional referral center.

Munson Medical Center became affiliated with Kalkaska Memorial Health Center in 1976 through a management agreement. Munson Healthcare was officially organized as a system of health care providers in 1985 when Paul Oliver Memorial Hospital in Frankfort affiliated with Munson Medical Center. The system now includes Charlevoix Area Hospital, Mercy Hospital Grayling, Mercy Hospital Cadillac, Otsego Memorial Hospital in Gaylord, and West Shore Medical Center in Manistee. Munson Healthcare employs more than 5,500 people.

References

Hospital buildings completed in 1925
Traverse City, Michigan
Hospitals in Michigan
Buildings and structures in Grand Traverse County, Michigan
Companies based in Grand Traverse County, Michigan
Medical and health organizations based in Michigan
Hospital networks in the United States
Trauma centers